East Durham Historic District is a national historic district located at Durham, Durham County, North Carolina. The district encompasses 731 contributing buildings and 1 contributing site (Barbee Graveyard) in a predominantly residential section of Durham. The buildings primarily date between about 1890 and 1955 and include notable examples of Classical Revival and Queen Anne architecture.  Notable buildings include the Holloway Street School (1928), East Durham Junior High School (c. 1940), Advent Christian Church (1920s), John Cheek House (1899), Community Groceries (1900), George Brown Grocery Store (1920), Seagroves Grocery Store (1915), and The People's Bank (1921).

It was listed on the National Register of Historic Places in 2004.

References

Historic districts on the National Register of Historic Places in North Carolina
Queen Anne architecture in North Carolina
Neoclassical architecture in North Carolina
Historic districts in Durham, North Carolina
National Register of Historic Places in Durham County, North Carolina
Neighborhoods in Durham, North Carolina